The Olowo of Owo is the paramount Yoruba king of Owo, a city in Ondo State, southwestern Nigeria which was the capital of Yoruba between 1400 and 1600 AD. Ojugbelu Arere, the first Olowo of Owo was the direct descendant of Oduduwa known as the father of the Yorubas. The current Olowo of Owo is His Imperial Majesty, Alayeluwa, Oba Ajibade Gbadegesin Ogunoye III, who is also the 32nd paramount ruler of Owo kingdom. The name Owo meaning Respect in British English was coined from the intrigue attitude of Ojugbelu who was the pioneer Olowo of Owo.

Ruling families
Owo is ruled by princes who are descendants of Olowo Elewuokun according to Ifá consultations. The king is often assisted by appointed chiefs collectively known as Edibo Ologho and other chief such as the, Sashere, Ojumu Odo, Elerewe Ayida, Ajana Atelukoluko, the ifa priest of Owo and Akowa loja who is the head of chiefs in Iloro quarters of Owo.
According to Owo traditions, the Olowo is often appointed by king-makers,  Omolowo's  after which the iloro chiefs under the leadership of Akowa loja play a significant role in the king installations. The iloro chief comprises the senior chiefs collectively known as Ighare and the others collectively known as the Ugbama. Both play a major role during the installation of the appointed Olowo of Owo.

Reigned Olowo
Ojugbelu Arere, (1019-1070) the first Olowo of Owo
Olowo Imade (1070-1106)
Olowo Korodo(1106-1156)
Olowo Agwobojoro(1156-1209)
Olowo Odondon (1209-1260)
Olowo Ajegunren (1260-1305)
Olowo Asunsola(1305 -1332)
Olowo Rerengejen(1340-1356)
Olowo Asunsoma(1356-1386)
Olowo Geja/Ogeja(1386-1430)
Olowo Imagele(1430-1481)
Olowo Alamuren(1481-1539)
Olowo Omasan(1539-1578)
Olowo Omaro(1578-1600)
Olowo Osogboye(1600-1648)
Olowo Alubiolokun(1648-1690)
Olowo Otutubosun(1690-1719)
Olowo Ajagbusiekon(1719-1760)
Olowo Ajaka(1760-1781)
Olowo Elewuokun(1781-1833) 
Olowo Aghagunghaye & Sons(1833-1876)
Olowo Adaraloye (1876-1880)
Olowo Aladetoun (1880-1889)
Olowo Aralepo Olubila(1889)
Olowo Olagbegi Atanneye I(1889-1902)
Olowo Olateru Olagbegi I(1913-1938)
Olowo Ajike Ogunoye (1938-1941)
Olowo Olateru Olagbegi II (1941-1968) 
Olowo Adekola Ogunoye II (1968-1993)
Olowo Olateru Olagbegi II (1993-1999)
Folagbade Olateru Olagbegi III (1999-2019).
Oba Ajibade Gbadegesin Ogunoye III (July 2019 - till date)

See also
Owo
Palace of Olowo of Owo
Royal titles of the Yoruba traditional rulers

References

Yoruba royal titles
Owo